Juraj Pilát (born 2 February 1992) is a Slovak football midfielder who plays for Púchov.

Career
Pilát made his first Corgoň Liga appearance for ViOn against AS Trenčín.

External links
FC ViOn profile

References

1991 births
Living people
Slovak footballers
Association football midfielders
MŠK Púchov players
FC ViOn Zlaté Moravce players
Slovak Super Liga players
People from Púchov District
Sportspeople from the Trenčín Region